Allyson Malott (born October 31, 1992) is an American basketball player who last played for the Washington Mystics of the Women's National Basketball Association (WNBA). She was drafted eighth overall in the 2015 WNBA draft.

College
During the 2014–15 NCAA Division I women's basketball season Malott shot 41.3% from three-point attempts, making her known as a top shooter.

Dayton statistics
Source

Professional career

Her career field goal percentage was 38.3, Free Throws 81.0, and she averaged 2.7 PPG.

Personal life
Malott graduated from the University of Dayton. She studied exercise science.

References

External links

Allyson Malott at EuroBasket
Ally Malott at Dayton Flyers

1992 births
Living people
Basketball players from Ohio
Dayton Flyers women's basketball players
Forwards (basketball)
McDonald's High School All-Americans
Parade High School All-Americans (girls' basketball)
Sportspeople from Middletown, Ohio
Washington Mystics draft picks
Washington Mystics players
21st-century American women